The following is a list of usurpers – illegitimate or controversial claimants to the throne in a monarchy. The word usurper is a derogatory term, and as such not easily definable, as the person seizing power normally will try to legitimise his position, while denigrating that of his predecessor.

Belgium

China

Egypt

England

France

Gwynedd (Wales)

Hawaii

See also Aliʻi nui of Hawaii.

Holy Roman Empire

India

Iran (Persia)

Japan

Korea

Mesopotamia

Netherlands

Norway

Roman Empire

Russia

Sweden

Thailand

Vietnam

Usurpers
 
Usurpers